Albino Blacksheep (ABS) is an animation website made by Steven Lerner in Toronto, Ontario on January 4, 1999. It publishes member submitted digital media made with Adobe Flash. The website also features image galleries, audio files, and text files. along with a mobile section that provided ring tones, screensavers, and wallpaper for mobile phones.

Etymology
According to the site's creator Steven Lerner, the name is an intentional oxymoron; by definition, a black sheep cannot be an albino because it quite obviously possesses skin pigmentation. He also points out that "black sheep" can also be interpreted as "outcast" and that the site's title could be interpreted to refer to an albino outcast.

History
Albino Blacksheep was founded on January 4, 1999, by Steven Lerner, to promote his band of the same name, which was started in 1996. Very little information on the band Albino Blacksheep exists. In 2000, Steven took a web design course and redesigned the website. This new incarnation contained rants, graphical images, and a video stream from Lerner's video camera.

Perhaps Lerner's first famous work was in 2003, with his site's Google bomb for French military victories. Between then and 2006, the site had been growing in popularity, receiving about 1.50 million pageviews per day.

Albino Blacksheep is also famous for being a major portal for Flash animation and animutation (a Flash animation style created by Neil Cicierega in 2001). The popular Web game Musical Lantern can be found on this site. The website also helped the band Tally Hall achieve some notability after posting their music video Banana Man.

On April 1, 2007, Lerner changed the homepage to a joke homepage, designed to make people think that the site had been bought and turned into "Google Animations". The joke was reinforced by a fake blog stating that
"Albino Blacksheep has been acquired by Google Inc. for roughly $32 million in stock options. The deal was discussed over a casual breakfast in Mountain View, California between the Canadian-born founder of Albino Blacksheep and the Google co-founders and CEO. Plans are underway for Google Inc. to tie its services and software into the former Albino Blacksheep website which will go by the new name Google Animation."

Notes and references

External links
 Albino Blacksheep

1999 establishments in Ontario
Internet properties established in 1999
Canadian comedy websites
Free music download websites